Shamirpet is a major revenue village panchayat, and also a suburb of Hyderabad city and district headquarters of Medchal-Malkajgiri district of the Indian state of Telangana. It is also the mandal headquarter of Shamirpet mandal in Keesara revenue division. Many clubs and resorts such as Aalankrita 4-star resort, Leonia Holistic Destination, Celebrity Resorts, Darling Caves, Honeyberg Resort etc., are located here.

It is a part of Hyderabad Metropolitan Area.

It is home to Shamirpet lake, Jawahar Deer Park, Genome Valley, NALSAR University of Law, Institute of Public Enterprise, BITS Pilani - Hyderabad

References 

Villages in Ranga Reddy district